Heinz Weis (born 14 July 1963) is a male former hammer thrower from Germany. He competed for West Germany until 1990.

Weis was born in Trier, Rhineland-Palatinate, and at club level represented TV 1863 Germania Trier. He was coached initially by Ernst Klement and later by LG Bayer Leverkusen coaches Rudolf Hars and Bernhard Rieder. He competed in four Olympic Games. His personal best throw was 83.04 metres, achieved in June 1997 in Frankfurt. This ranks him second among German hammer throwers, only behind Ralf Haber.

While he was active he was 1.93 m and 125 kg. He has one daughter (Theresa).

International competitions

References

External links
 
 
 

1963 births
Living people
Sportspeople from Trier
German male hammer throwers
West German male hammer throwers
Olympic athletes of West Germany
Olympic athletes of Germany
Athletes (track and field) at the 1988 Summer Olympics
Athletes (track and field) at the 1992 Summer Olympics
Athletes (track and field) at the 1996 Summer Olympics
Athletes (track and field) at the 2000 Summer Olympics
World Athletics Championships athletes for West Germany
World Athletics Championships athletes for Germany
World Athletics Championships medalists
European Athletics Championships medalists
Universiade medalists in athletics (track and field)
Universiade gold medalists for West Germany
Universiade silver medalists for West Germany
Universiade bronze medalists for Germany
World Athletics Championships winners
Medalists at the 1987 Summer Universiade
Medalists at the 1989 Summer Universiade
Medalists at the 1991 Summer Universiade